In mathematics, recurrent sequence may refer to:

 A sequence satisfying a recurrence relation
 Recurrent word, a sequence such that any factor (consecutive subsequence) that appears does so infinitely often, such as the Thue–Morse sequence or a Sturmian word